J. Arundhathi (born 6 August 1945) is an Indian politician from Kerala, India. She represented Vamanapuram constituency in 12th (2006) Kerala Legislative Assembly. She is a member of the Communist Party of India (Marxist) Thiruvananthapuram District Committee.

Biography
She was born on 6 August 1945 at Pettah, Thiruvananthapuram to N. Madhavan Pillai and Janamma. She entered active politics as a student. She was a member of Vembayam Grama Panchayat, Nedumangad Block Panchayat and Thiruvananthapuram District Panchayat. She is the Joint District Secretary of the All India Democratic Women's Association, Thiruvananthapuram.

References

Communist Party of India (Marxist) politicians from Kerala
People from Thiruvananthapuram district
Living people
1945 births
Kerala MLAs 2006–2011